Hyacinthe Camille Teisseire (22 September 1764 – 12 September 1842) was a French politician and businessman prominent in the civic and industrial life of Grenoble, the city of his birth, during the first half of the 19th century. From 1820 until 1824 he served as the representative for Isère in the French Chamber of Deputies. As a businessman he ran the distilling company Teisseire which had been founded by his grandfather in 1720 and was famous for its cherry liqueur Ratafia de Teisseire.

In 1794 Camille married Marine Périer, the daughter of the French banker and industrialist Claude Perier. The couple had ten children, not all of whom survived to adulthood.  When Teisseire took up his seat in the Chamber of Deputies in 1820, he turned the management of the distilling business over to his eldest son Charles, and the company became known for a period as Teisseire, Père & Fils (Teisseire, Father & Son). Camille Teisseire died in Grenoble at the age of 77 and is buried in the Saint Roch Cemetery.

References

1764 births
1842 deaths
Members of the Chamber of Deputies of the Bourbon Restoration
19th-century French businesspeople
18th-century French businesspeople
Businesspeople from Grenoble
Politicians from Grenoble